Soumaila Samake (born March 18, 1978) is a Malian former professional basketball player. A 7'0" tall center, he was drafted by the New Jersey Nets in the second round of the 2000 NBA draft, and played for the Nets and the Los Angeles Lakers. He scored 68 points and grabbed 76 rebounds in 47 NBA games between 2000 and 2003. His final NBA game was played on December 4th, 2002 in a 85 - 93 loss to the Utah Jazz where he played for 2 minutes and recorded no stats.

While playing with the Lakers in 2002, Samake was suspended five games after testing positive for Nandrolone, an anabolic steroid. Samake said that he had accidentally ingested the substance while taking a dietary supplement. He was only the third NBA player suspended for steroids, following Don MacLean and Matt Geiger.

On November 29, 2011, it was announced that the National Basketball League of Canada's Quebec Kebs had signed Samake to their active roster.

References

External links
NBA.com: Soumaila Samake Bio

1978 births
Living people
Centers (basketball)
Cincinnati Stuff players
Malian expatriate basketball people in the United States
Greenville Groove players
Jilin Northeast Tigers players
KK Mornar Bar players
KK Olimpija players
Laval Kebs players
Los Angeles Lakers players
Malian expatriates in the United States
Malian men's basketball players
New Jersey Nets draft picks
New Jersey Nets players
Orlandina Basket players
People from Sikasso Region
Zhejiang Golden Bulls players
21st-century Malian people